Beverley Jane Hunt  is professor of thrombosis and haemostasis at King's College, London, consultant in the departments of haematology, rheumatology and pathology and director of the Haemostasis Research Unit at Guy's and St Thomas' Foundation Trust, medical director of Thrombosis UK and previous president of Walthamstow Hall Old Girls Association.  She was educated at Walthamstow Hall and University of Liverpool.

Specialist interest and research 
Hunt is author and co-author of many peer-reviewed research articles. She has a specialist clinical and research interest in venous thromboembolism, thromboprophylaxis, antiphospholipid syndrome, lupus erythematosus, and obstetric haematology. Prof. Hunt has served as the Steering Committee Chair of the World Thrombosis Day Steering Committee since 2019. She has been a member of the steering committee since the campaign's inception in 2014.

Books 
She is co-editor of The Obstetric Hematology Manual, and also of  An Introduction to Vascular Biology: From Basic Science to Clinical Practice.

Society memberships 
She is the founder and co-lead of the British Society for Haematology Obstetric Haematology Group from 2004, a founder member of the society's Education Committee from 2009, and a member of the British Society for Haemostasis and Thrombosis, the International Society of Thrombosis and Haemostasis and is a Fellow of the Royal College of Physicians. She has been a member of the World Thrombosis Day steering committee since the campaigns' inception in 2014.

Contribution to national guidelines 
She was the co-author of several reports and guidelines: the British Society of Haematology's "Guidelines for TTP" in 2001 and 2002, and an advisor on the Royal College of Obstetricians and Gynaecologists: "Advice on preventing deep vein thrombosis for pregnant women travelling by air" produced in October 2001 and an advisor on the Royal College of Obstetricians guideline on: "Thromboprophylaxis in pregnancy" in 2004 and 2009.

She is a member of "The Independent Expert Panel on Venous Thromboembolism" 2005/6, and co-author on the "International Consensus report on the investigation and management of primary immune thrombocytopenia", the "Clinical guidelines for testing for heritable thrombophilia" co-author on the "Guideline for investigation and management of adults and children presenting with a thrombocytosis"
 the "Management of bleeding following major trauma: an updated European guideline".

She was a member of the National Institute for Health and Care Excellence (NICE) guidelines development group for: "reducing the risk of venous thromboembolism (deep vein thrombosis and pulmonary embolism) in patients admitted to hospital" published in 2010 and also the "Acute management of venous thromboembolism" published in 2012. On behalf of Thrombosis UK, she was also a member of the committee producing the NICE Quality standards on VTE prevention.

Charity 
Hunt is co-founder and medical director of Thrombosis UK which campaigns to raise awareness of thrombosis—in particular the risk of hospital-acquired deep vein thrombosis by mandating risk assessment. Prof. Hunt was a founding member of the World Thrombosis Day steering committee, which is the global awareness campaign of the International Society on Thrombosis and Haemostasis (ISTH) that is recognized on October 13 each year and raises awareness of thrombosis.

Honours and awards 
She was winner in the Diagnostic/Laboratory category winner at the NHS London Innovation awards 2009 for “Detection of antiphospholipid antibodies based in heparin resistance.”, and won the 2011 Research paper of the year at the Briths Medical Journal Group for a paper titled "Effects of tranexamic acid on death, vascular occlusive events, and blood transfusion in trauma patients with significant haemorrhage (CRASH-2): a randomised, placebo-controlled trial" which was published in The Lancet (2010;376:23–32).

Hunt was appointed Officer of the Order of the British Empire (OBE) in the 2019 Birthday Honours for services to medicine.

References

External links 
 GSTS
 Lifeblood, the Thrombosis Charity
 CRASH-2 Trial
 WOMAN Study

Year of birth missing (living people)
Living people
People educated at Walthamstow Hall
Alumni of the University of Liverpool
Academics of King's College London
Fellows of the Royal College of Physicians
Fellows of the Royal College of Pathologists
British haematologists
Officers of the Order of the British Empire